Richard Le Quesne Savage (born 10 December 1955) is an English teacher and former cricketer who occasionally played first-class and List A cricket between 1976 and 1979 for Oxford University and Warwickshire.

Savage was born in London. He was educated at Marlborough College and at Pembroke College, Oxford. He took 50 wickets with right-arm medium-pace off-cutters and off-breaks for Warwickshire's second eleven in 1975 before going to Oxford University. He was in the Oxford University cricket team for three years, playing each season in the University Match and he also played in the Combined Universities team which competed in the Benson and Hedges Cup List A competition. In 1976, he played as well for the Oxford and Cambridge Universities side that took on the touring West Indies team. For Oxford against Sussex in 1976, he took six wickets for 66 in the first innings and six for 33 in the second to finish with 12 for 99, the best match figures of his career and the best figures by any bowler in a first-class match on the Pagham Cricket Club Ground.

In university holidays throughout his Oxford career, Savage turned out in occasional games for Warwickshire and in one of those, the 1977 game against Glamorgan, he took seven second innings wickets for 50 runs, the best innings performance of his career. Having left university in 1978, Savage had a single season as a full-time cricketer with Warwickshire in 1979, but was not successful, and left the first-class game. During his career, he once dismissed Viv Richards.

Savage is a teacher of English at Ardingly College, and taught at comprehensive schools in Bristol and Oxford for fifteen years before teaching at international schools in Belgium and the UK. He is married to Green Party MP Caroline Lucas; the couple have two adult sons.

References

1955 births
Living people
English cricketers
Warwickshire cricketers
Oxford University cricketers
Oxford and Cambridge Universities cricketers
People educated at Marlborough College
Alumni of Pembroke College, Oxford
Schoolteachers from Sussex
British Universities cricketers
Spouses of British politicians